Jean Maspero (20 December 1885 – 17 February 1915) was an early 20th-century French papyrologist. He was the son of egyptologist Gaston Maspero and his wife née Louise d'Estournelles de Constant (Sister of Paul d'Estournel de Constant, winner of the 1909 Nobel Peace Prize), and brother of Henri and Georges Maspero.

Works 
1912: Organisation militaire de l'Égypte byzantine, In-8, 157 p. (Paris)
1914: Horapollon et la fin du paganisme égyptien, Bulletin de l‘Institut Français d'Archéologie Orientale, n° 11, (p. 163–195).
1916: Papyrus grecs d'époque byzantine, Catalogue général des antiquités égyptiennes, imprimerie de l‘Institut français d'archéologie orientale,

1932: Fouilles exécutées à Bawit by Jean Maspero, notes ordered and edited by Étienne Drioton. Premier fascicule, Institut français d'archéologie orientale.

Bibliography 
 Bibliographie Altagypten 1822-1946, Christine Beinlich-Seeber, Harrassowitz 1998
 Ostraca grecs et coptes des fouilles de Jean Maspero à Baouit, O.BawitIFAO 1-67 et O.Nancy (Bibl. d'Études Coptes, 17). Boud'hors Anne, Cairo, 2004.

French papyrologists
Writers from Paris
1885 births
1915 deaths
French military personnel killed in World War I